Kappalabandham is a village in the Khammam district, in the state of Telangana, India. It is located 3 km from its local Mandal at Kalluru.

Demographics
Near kallur, Kallur is between Tallada and VM Banjer
There are approximately 500 households in the village and surrounding area.

Economy

The local economy is driven by agriculture, based primarily on cotton, rice, and sugar.

References

Villages in Khammam district